Popular Songs is the twelfth full-length album by the American indie rock band Yo La Tengo, released digitally, on CD, and double LP on September 8, 2009, by the Matador record label.

Content

Artwork 
The band contacted the conceptual artist Dario Robleto. He contributed three pieces for the album design:

At War With the Entropy of Nature / Ghost Don't Always Want to Come Back (2002) (cover)
A Dark Day for the Dinosaurs (Radio Edit) (2000-2001) (inlay)
Sometimes Billie Is All That Holds Me Together (1998-1999) (back cover)

Music videos 
Four videos were made by the director John McSwain to accompany one song from the album each. In the weeks leading up to the release of the album, a new video was posted on Matador's various "partner sites" and collected on Matador's own website. The first video, for "Here to Fall", was posted on Matador's own "Matablog" on July 28, 2009.

Release 

Popular Songs was leaked onto the Internet on July 26. In response, Matador began streaming the album to Buy Early Get Now customers on July 28, more than a week before the stream was originally advertised to begin.

Popular Songs was released on September 8, 2009, by Matador. It was the eighth album to be given Matador's Buy Early Get Now treatment, in which it was sold with a vinyl LP with Yo La Tengo's original score from the film Adventureland, as well as three bonus tracks as download in MP3 and FLAC. The first two of these downloads were demo versions of two album tracks and became available shortly before the release of the CD. The third download became available on December 15, 2009. The same track is also available in the iTunes Store and on the Japanese CD issue of the album.

By 2012, it had sold over 43,000 copies in United States.

Track listing
All songs written by Georgia Hubley, Ira Kaplan and James McNew.

 Bonus tracks
<li>"You've Got a Friend" (Carole King) - 4:10 (Japanese CD, Argentine CD, Buy Early Get Now & iTunes bonus track)
<li>"Nothing to Hide (Demo)" - 9:47 (Buy Early Get Now bonus track)
<li>"Periodically Double or Triple (Demo)" - 7:39 (Buy Early Get Now bonus track)

Personnel
String arrangements by Richard Evans

David Angel, Pamela Sixfin - violin
Monisa Angell, Kristin Wilkingson - viola
John Catchings - cello
recorded by John Mark Painter at IHOF in Nashville
Doug Wieselman - clarinet
Produced by Roger Moutenot
Mastered by Greg Calbi at Sterling Sound

References

External links 
 

2009 albums
Yo La Tengo albums